The Fayette Power Project, also known as Sam Seymour Power Plant, is a coal-fired power plant located near La Grange, Texas in Fayette County, Texas.  It is owned by Austin Energy and the Lower Colorado River Authority (LCRA) and operated by LCRA.

Three generating units comprise the Fayette Power Project:

 Unit 1, completed in 1979, with a generating capacity of 615 megawatts
 Unit 2, completed in 1980, with a generating capacity of 615 megawatts
 Unit 3, completed in 1988, with a generating capacity of 460 megawatts

The main source of fuel for the Fayette Power Project is low-sulfur coal from the Powder River Basin in Wyoming.  Cooling water is provided by the Fayette County Reservoir, a  freshwater reservoir.

History 
During the 2021 Texas power crisis, Fayette Power Project was reported to have lost 453MW of generation capacity across Units 1 and 2 on February 17, 2021.

See also

 List of power stations in Texas

References

External links
Lower Colorado River Authority page for the Fayette Power Project

Energy infrastructure completed in 1979
Energy infrastructure completed in 1980
Energy infrastructure completed in 1988
Coal-fired power stations in Texas
Buildings and structures in Fayette County, Texas
Lower Colorado River Authority